"Backin' It Up" is a hip hop song by American rapper Pardison Fontaine, featuring vocals from fellow American rapper Cardi B. It was released along with its music video on September 20, 2018, by Atlantic Records. The song was written by the two artists, along its producers, J-Louis, Syk Sense, and Epikh Pro. It contains an interpolation of "Gettin' Some", with Shawnna, Too Short, Shorty B and Pee-Wee of The Dangerous Crew, and Xcel being credited as co-writers. It was certified platinum by the Recording Industry Association of America (RIAA).

Background
Fontaine and Cardi B are long-time collaborators, having worked together on several songs. "Backin' It Up" was previewed at a 2018 MTV Video Music Awards afterparty that Cardi attended. It is the first song released from Fontaine's major label debut EP.

Music video
Directed by Kid Art, the song's music video shows Fontaine, Cardi B and their crew performing in illuminated floors and parking garages, wearing luxurious fabrics and jewels. In the clip, Fontaine enters a pizzeria and proceeds to flirt with other man's girl. Cardi first appears in a Lil' Kim-inspired all-red outfit.

Live performances
Pardison Fontaine and Cardi B gave the first televised performance of the song at the 2018 BET Hip Hop Awards. Fontaine joined Cardi on stage following her performance of "Get Up 10".

Charts

Weekly charts

Year-end charts

Certifications

Release history

References

External links

2018 singles
2018 songs
Atlantic Records singles
Cardi B songs
Songs written by Cardi B
Songs written by Pardison Fontaine
Songs written by Too Short
Songs written by Shawnna